Planica 1991 was a two day ski flying competition part of 1990/91 World Cup season, held from 23–24 March 1991 in Planica, SR Slovenia, Yugoslavia. Total of 80,000 people have gathered in three days.

Schedule

All jumps over 190 metres 
Chronological order:
196 metres (643 ft) – 23 March – André Kiesewetter (WR touch; 2RD, canceled and repeated after)
191 metres (627 ft) – 23 March – Stephan Zünd (3RD)
191 metres (627 ft) – 23 March – André Kiesewetter (3RD)
190 metres (623 ft) – 24 March – Ralph Gebstedt (3RD)

World Cup
There were two individual ski flying events on Velikanka bratov Gorišek K185. By ski flying rules of that time there were three round of jumps, but only two best counted in a final result. Total prize money of 12,000 CHF and 5,000 CHF for the winner.

On 21 March 1991, at an official hill test opening, Austrian Heinz Frank made the longest jump of the hill test at 184 metres (604 ft).

On 22 March 1991, official training was scheduled in front of 15,000 disappointed people, but canceled after only 7 Yugoslavian trial jumpers, as strong wind mixed with rain and high temperatures, overturned one of the TV cameras. Igor Strgar was the longest on a wet inrun track at 150 metres. Training was rescheduled on the next day (23 March) with one round, just before the first competition.

On 23 March 1991, a total of five rounds were taken in one day, this happened the first and the only time so far in ski flying history. Official training round from previous day took turn first, then competition came. In second round, André Kiesewetter touched the ground at world record distance at 196 metres, after that jury canceled it and repeated the 2nd round from the lower inrun gate. Later in the 3rd round Stephan Zünd landed at 191 metres and Kiesewetter tied that distance after him.

On 24 March 1991, after fantastic jump of 19 year old German Ralph Gebstedt at 190 metres in the third round, he was already proclaimed as a winner by event host and excited crowd. Round was almost canceled and repeated by the jury after Gebstedt's jump, but it didn't, and it counted as final result. After that jump Gebstedt said: "I had no problems at landing at all".

First competition
WC #273 — Official results — 40,000 people — 23 March 1991

 Didn't count in final result. The worst of three jumps.

Second competition
WC #274 — Official results — 25,000 people — 24 March 1991

Invalid ski flying world record
The all-time longest ski jump in parallel style ever.

 Not recognized! Touch ground at world record distance.

References

1991 in Slovenian sport
1991 in ski jumping
1991 in Yugoslav sport
1991 in Slovenia
Ski jumping competitions in Yugoslavia
International sports competitions hosted by Yugoslavia
Ski jumping competitions in Slovenia
International sports competitions hosted by Slovenia
March 1991 sports events in Europe